Carlos Roberto Baute Jiménez (born March 8, 1974, in Caracas, Venezuela), best known simply as Carlos Baute, is a Venezuelan singer-songwriter and television host. His music is mostly in the Latin pop genre, with some ballads and Bachata.

Early life
He is the youngest son of Alfonso Baute and Clara Jiménez. His father was born in Tenerife, Spain and his mom was born in Venezuela, both with a long family tail of Spanish origins. Baute's surname is of Guanches origin, the indigenous Berber peoples of the Canary Islands in Spain.

Career
In 1987 At age 13, he joined Los Chamos, which released an album entitled Con un poco de Amor in 1990. He worked as a model and released his first solo album titled Orígenes I in 1994. He acted in the Venezuelan telenovela, Destino de Mujer (1997), as Pedro José, a swimming instructor.

With the album Yo nací para querer... (1999), he moved to Spain and had much success with all his albums. He acted in the television series Aladinna (TVE), Mis Adorables Vecinos (Antena 3) and was the host of Gala Miss España, Gala IB3, and Gala Fin de Año de TVE1.

Baute has released six albums, including a greatest hits album. On April 1, 2008, he released De Mi Puño y Letra, which included "Colgando en tus manos".  He released two versions, one solo and one with Marta Sánchez. The duet rose to the top of the charts in many Spanish-speaking countries worldwide.

Although well known in many Hispanic countries, he has not crossed over into many other markets.

In October 2012, he released a duet with Laura Pausini, "Las cosas que no me espero".

He now lives in Spain and has Spanish citizenship.

By March 2014, during the Venezuelan riots, he released a music video asking for "Respect" amongst citizens of different political sides. In the video "Que tu voz sea mi voz", Baute appears with the national flag painted on his face.

Personal life
By June 2012 Carlos Baute married the Venezuelan model Astrid Klisans.

During the Venezuelan presidential crisis, Baute stated his position of support for Juan Guaidó, saying he has not visited Venezuela for eight years after being blacklisted by the Maduro government.

Discography

Albums

Singles

Featured in

References

External links 
Official website
English website

1974 births
Living people
Latin pop singers
Singers from Caracas
Venezuelan expatriates in Spain
Venezuelan people of Cuban descent
Venezuelan people of Spanish descent
Venezuelan television personalities
20th-century Venezuelan male singers
Venezuelan exiles
21st-century Venezuelan male singers